The , also known as the Kobe City Forest Botanical Garden, is a 142.6-hectare botanical garden and arboretum located near Mount Maya at 4-1 Nakaichiri-yama, Shimotanigami, Yamada-cho, Kita-ku, Kobe, Japan. It is operated by the city and open daily except Wednesdays; an admission fee is charged.

The arboretum was established in 1940 and now contains approximately 1,200 kinds of trees and shrubs from Japan as well as other parts of Asia, Australasia, Europe, and North America, with good collections of cherry trees, conifers, hydrangea, and rhododendrons.

See also 

 Rokko Alpine Botanical Garden (nearby)
 List of botanical gardens in Japan

References 
 Kobe Municipal Arboretum (Japanese)
 BGCI entry
 Japanese Botanic Gardens and their Contribution to Plant Conservation

Arboreta in Japan
Botanical gardens in Japan
Gardens in Hyōgo Prefecture
Geography of Kobe
Tourist attractions in Kobe